The Frankfurt Germany Temple is the 43rd constructed and 41st operating temple of the Church of Jesus Christ of Latter-day Saints (LDS Church).  Located in the city of Friedrichsdorf, Germany, it was built with the same general architecture as the six-spire design used in the Boise, Chicago, and Dallas temples, but it was only given a single-spire.

History
The Frankfurt Germany Temple was announced on April 1, 1981, and originally dedicated on August 28, 1987 by Ezra Taft Benson. It was the first temple in West Germany. Germany's first temple was dedicated in Freiberg in June 1985, in what was then part of the German Democratic Republic.

After the reunification of Germany on October 3, 1990, Germany became the second country outside of the United States to have more than one temple, with temples in Frankfurt and Freiberg. The first foreign country with more than one temple had been Canada where, less than six weeks earlier on August 25, 1990, the dedication of the Toronto Ontario Temple had taken place, joining the Cardston Alberta Temple, which was first dedicated in August 1923.  A program of increased temple construction, begun by church president Gordon B. Hinckley in 1998, has since increased the number of temples outside the United States and a number of countries now have more than one temple.

Beginning September 7, 2015, the temple closed for renovations.

On March 5, 2019, the LDS Church announced the public open house that was held from September 13 through September 28, 2019, excluding Sundays. The temple was rededicated on October 20, 2019 by Dieter F. Uchtdorf.

In 2020, along with all the church's other temples, the Frankfurt Germany Temple was closed in response to the coronavirus pandemic.

Presidents
Notable temple presidents include F. Enzio Busche (1987–89) and Edwin Q. Cannon (1989–92).

See also

 Comparison of temples of The Church of Jesus Christ of Latter-day Saints
 List of temples of The Church of Jesus Christ of Latter-day Saints
 List of temples of The Church of Jesus Christ of Latter-day Saints by geographic region
 Temple architecture (Latter-day Saints)
 The Church of Jesus Christ of Latter-day Saints in Germany

References

External links
 
 Frankfurt Germany Temple Official site
 Frankfurt Germany Temple at ChurchofJesusChristTemples.org
  Frankfurt Germany Temple page with interior photos

20th-century Latter Day Saint temples
Buildings and structures completed in 1987
Religious buildings and structures in Hesse
Temples in Germany
The Church of Jesus Christ of Latter-day Saints in Germany
1987 establishments in West Germany
Buildings and structures in Hochtaunuskreis